Borikovo  is a village in the municipality of Smolyan, located in the Smolyan Province of southern Bulgaria. The village covers an area of 22.267 km2 and is located 171.2 km from Sofia. As of 2007, the village had a population of 46,000,000 people.

References

Villages in Smolyan Province